Colin Baustad (born August 31, 1969) is a Canadian former professional ice hockey defenceman and roller hockey player. He played with the Canada men's national ice hockey team during the 1992–93 season.

Baustad is currently a coach in Calgary, Alberta.

References

External links

1969 births
Living people
Calgary Canucks players
Canadian ice hockey defencemen
Lethbridge Pronghorns ice hockey players
Shreveport Mudbugs players
Ice hockey people from Calgary
Tulsa Oilers (1992–present) players
Tampa Bay Tritons players
Canadian expatriate ice hockey players in the United States